The Whip Woman is a lost 1928 silent film produced and distributed by First National Pictures and directed by Joseph C. Boyle. The film starred Estelle Taylor, Antonio Moreno, Hedda Hopper and Lowell Sherman. Supporting actors including fifteen-year-old Loretta Young.

Synopsis
Sari (Estelle Taylor), the titular whip-wielding woman, is a Hungarian peasant who intervenes to prevent Count Michael Ferrenzi (Antonio Moreno) from committing suicide. The grateful Count wants to marry Sari, but his aristocratic mother (Hedda Hopper) tries to stop their wedding. Sari and the Count are eventually wed despite the circumstances.

Cast
Estelle Taylor as Sari
Antonio Moreno as Count Michael Ferenzi
Lowell Sherman as Baron
Hedda Hopper as Countess Ferenzi
Julanne Johnston as Madame Haldane
Loretta Young as The Girl

References

External links

lobby poster; lost film(Wayback)

1928 films
American silent feature films
First National Pictures films
Lost American films
1928 drama films
Silent American drama films
American black-and-white films
Films directed by Joseph Boyle
1920s American films